The Wayne Chicken Show is an annual free, family-oriented event held in Wayne, Nebraska, every second Saturday in July.  It has been put on by the Wayne Area Chamber of Commerce since 1981.

Details
Friday
The movement kicks off on the afternoon of the second Friday in July.  A section of Main Street in Wayne closes to traffic, allowing for a street fair of sorts, called Henoween.  Food stands, craft vendors, and kids' games are set up along the block.  Activities that take place include the World's Largest Chicken Dance, put on by Wayne State College's cheerleading squad; the Cement Chicken Auction; a hot wing eating contest; a fireworks show put on by the Wayne Jaycees; and a teen dance.

Saturday
The Chicken Show lasts virtually all day, but the parade kicks off the main event.  The parade includes over 100 entries and marches up Main Street to Bressler Park, where most of the activities are held.  In the afternoon, the Wayne Rotary Club serves grilled chicken.  Activities include a chicken-flying contest; a cluck-off; an egg toss; an egg drop; a hard-boiled egg-eating contest; a chicken hat contest; and a rubber chicken throwing contest.

Sunday
Main events include a car show and a poker run.

History
The Wayne Chicken Show was founded in 1981 by the Wayne Regional Arts Council.  They chose chickens as the main theme for three reasons: the humor associated with chickens, the general knowledge of chickens in the rural community, and the easy art ideas that could come from chickens.
Themes were added to the event starting in 1984 with the theme "Break Dancing," but they did not become a regular addition until 1997. The Friday events, now known as "Henoween," were added in 1991.

The National Cluck-Off
This is a contest of who can do the best chicken imitation.  Requirements of the contest are that you must be heard throughout the park, you must make chicken sounds and actions, and it must last 15 seconds.  Contestants from all over the country have participated in it and been nationally recognized; John Agler appeared on The Tonight Show with Johnny Carson in 1986. One winner, Joel Vavra, from Wilbur, Nebraska, was a guest on The Tonight Show with Jay Leno, and a nine-time winner, Del Hampton, was from Arkansas. Daniel Magruder of Omaha holds two 13-and-under titles, and J.T. Hobbs of Hoskins holds nine. Larry Pankoke of Linccoln has won one title.

Awards/Features

List of themes

Notes

References
City of Wayne. (2012). <http://www.chickenshow.com/> Retrieved April 11, 2012.
The Associated Press.  (2010).  <http://m.journalstar.com/news/state-and-regional/article_c9465034-805a-11df-a750-001cc4c002e0.html> Retrieved April 11, 2012.
City of Wayne.  (2010).  <http://www.facebook.com/note.php?note_id=386088022745> Retrieved April 11, 2012.
City of Wayne.  (2012).  <http://cityofwayne.org/index.aspx?nid=455>  Retrieved April 11, 2012.
neumannkn.  (2008).  <http://www.americanprofile.com/articles/wayne-chicken-show-2/> Retrieved April 11, 2012.
TripAdvisor®. (2010).  <http://tripadvisor.com/PressCenter-i2125-c1-Press_Releases.htm> Retrieved April 11, 2012.

Festivals in Nebraska
Recurring events established in 1981
Tourist attractions in Wayne County, Nebraska
1981 establishments in Nebraska